Soundboard or sound board may refer to:

Sound board (music), a part of a musical instrument
Sounding board, an attachment to a pulpit to assist a human speaker
Mixing console, used to combine electronic audio signals
Soundboard (computer program), a web application or computer program with buttons that play short, often humorous sound clips
Soundboard (magazine), a quarterly publication of the Guitar Foundation of America
Any circuit board used to produce or handle sound
Sound card
Sound chip
Sound board, building construction material used for soundproofing
Sounding board, a wooden board in a boat used to measure depth